The St. Paul's Episcopal Church is an historic Episcopal church located at Hillsboro, Caroline County, Maryland.  It is a small board-and-batten Carpenter Gothic-style structure set on a brick foundation.  Its design is based upon a book of plans and sketches published in 1852 by Richard Upjohn.

It was listed on the National Register of Historic Places in 1975.

See also
 List of post 1692 Anglican parishes in the Province of Maryland

References

External links
, including photo from 1968, at Maryland Historical Trust
The Historical Marker Database link

Churches completed in 1853
19th-century Episcopal church buildings
Churches on the National Register of Historic Places in Maryland
Episcopal church buildings in Maryland
Churches in Caroline County, Maryland
Carpenter Gothic church buildings in Maryland
Anglican parishes in the Province of Maryland
National Register of Historic Places in Caroline County, Maryland
1853 establishments in Maryland